The following is a list of those who have served as foreign ministers of Belgium.

1800s

1900s

2000s

Timeline

References

Foreign Affairs
Government of Belgium
 
Belgium
1831 establishments in Belgium